KWYR (1260 AM) is a radio station broadcasting a country music format. Licensed to Winner, South Dakota, United States. The station is currently owned by Midwest Radio Corp. and features programming from ABC Radio.

The KWYR station operates with a staff of seven full-time employees. The general manager and owner is Scott Schramm. Marsha Ray is the host of Focus 1260, a program run three times a week.

References

External links

WYR (AM)